The canton of Péronnas is a former administrative division in eastern France. It was disbanded following the French canton reorganisation which came into effect in March 2015. It had 14,371 inhabitants (2012).

The canton comprised 8 communes:

Lent
Montagnat
Montracol
Péronnas
Saint-André-sur-Vieux-Jonc
Saint-Just
Saint-Rémy
Servas

Demographics

See also
Cantons of the Ain department

References

Former cantons of Ain
2015 disestablishments in France
States and territories disestablished in 2015